Erwan Péron (born 25 May 1980) is a French lightweight rower. He won a gold medal at the 2001 World Rowing Championships in Lucerne with the lightweight men's eight. He also competed in the men's coxless pair event at the 2008 Summer Olympics.

References

External links 
 

1980 births
Living people
French male rowers
World Rowing Championships medalists for France
Rowers at the 2008 Summer Olympics
Olympic rowers of France